is a private junior college in Matsuyama, Ehime, Japan. It was established in 1952, and is now attached to Matsuyama University.

Departments
 Department of Commerce

See also 
 List of junior colleges in Japan

External links
 Matsuyama Junior College

Private universities and colleges in Japan
Japanese junior colleges
Universities and colleges in Ehime Prefecture